The Arges project was a research project in the field of metal-halide lamps, a form of electric lighting. The aim was to achieve a higher degree of energy efficiency in comparison to lamps used at the time. The project was commissioned by Eindhoven University of Technology and Philips Electronics. One of the problems which had to be solved was to let the experimental lamps burn reliably and constantly. Scientists believed that this problem was related to gravity, and to ascertain this experiments had to be performed in zero gravity. Therefore, part of the research took place aboard the International Space Station ISS during the Delta Mission in 2004. Dutch astronaut André Kuipers operated the apparatus transported to the ISS aboard the Soyuz TMA-4.

Literature

 
 Kroesen: “Wetenschappelijk rendement proef in ruimte honderd procent”. Cursor 2004

Research projects
Eindhoven University of Technology